In Java Platform, Enterprise Edition (Java EE), the Conversational state are the field values of a session bean plus the transitive closure of the objects reachable from the bean's fields. The name "conversational" is used as in this state the client interacts with the bean - a stateless session bean does not do so. For example, while a Cart bean might contain a conversational state to communicate with the client about the contents of their cart, an Order bean might not as the invocation is not necessary. The transitive closure of a bean is defined in terms of the serialization protocol for the Java programming language, that is, the fields that would be stored by serializing the bean instance.

References

Java enterprise platform